Tomás Lavanini (born 22 January 1993) is an Argentine rugby union player who plays as a second row for ASM Clermont Auvergne in France's Top 14. He previously played for Leicester Tigers in England's Premiership Rugby and the Argentine Super Rugby side , before joining the Jaguares, he had played the 2014–15 Top 14 season with French side Racing Métro.

Career

Lavanini represented Argentina Under 20 in the 2013 IRB Junior World Championship.

Tomás was part of the national team that competed at the 2015 Rugby World Cup.

Lavanini was red-carded in the second test against South Africa in the 2017 Rugby Championship, following two yellow cards being issued to him. Lavanini made his return from suspension at home against New Zealand in Buenos Aires only to be yellow-carded for a dangerous tackle. He was red-carded  for a high tackle on Owen Farrell in the pool game against England in the 2019 Rugby World Cup for which he received a four match ban.

On 6 May 2019, Leicester Tigers announced Lavanini's signing, with him set to join after the 2019 Rugby World Cup.  He made his Leicester debut from the bench on 2 November 2019 against Gloucester.  He played 38 times for Leicester across two seasons, scoring two tries.

In January 2021 it was confirmed that he would join French Top 14 side Clermont Auvergne ahead of the 2021–22 season.

On 21 November 2021, against Ireland, Lavanini received a record-breaking third international red card, for a high tackle. Lavanini is the most sin-binned rugby player in Argentina's history.

References

1993 births
Living people
Argentine people of Italian descent
Rugby union players from Buenos Aires
Rugby union locks
Hindú Club players
Argentine rugby union players
Argentina international rugby union players
Argentine expatriate rugby union players
Argentine expatriate sportspeople in France
Argentine expatriate sportspeople in England
Expatriate rugby union players in France
Racing 92 players
Jaguares (Super Rugby) players
Leicester Tigers players